Shimshon Avraham Amitsur (born Kaplan; ; August 26, 1921 – September 5, 1994) was an Israeli mathematician. He is best known for his work in ring theory, in particular PI rings,  an area of abstract algebra.

Biography
Amitsur was born in Jerusalem and studied at the Hebrew University under the supervision of Jacob Levitzki.  His studies were repeatedly interrupted, first by World War II and then by the 1948 Arab–Israeli War.  He received his M.Sc. degree in 1946, and his Ph.D. in 1950.  Later, for his joint work with Levitzki, he received the first Israel Prize in Exact Sciences.  He worked at the Hebrew University until his retirement in 1989. Amitsur was a visiting scholar at the Institute for Advanced Study from 1952 to 1954. He was an Invited Speaker at the ICM in 1970 in Nice. He was a member of the Israel Academy of Sciences, where he was the Head for Experimental Science Section.  He was one of the founding editors of the Israel Journal of Mathematics, and the mathematical editor of the Hebrew Encyclopedia.  Amitsur received a number of awards, including the honorary doctorate from Ben-Gurion University in 1990.  His students included Avinoam Mann, Amitai Regev, Eliyahu Rips and Aner Shalev.

Awards
Amitsur and Jacob Levitzki were each awarded the Israel Prize in exact sciences, in 1953, its inaugural year.

See also

Amitsur–Levitzki theorem
List of Israel Prize recipients

Publications

References

 "Shimshon Avraham Amitsur (1921 — 1994)", by A. Mann, Israel Journal of Mathematics, Vol. 96 (December 1996), ix - xxvii.

External links 
 
 
 Colleagues, students and family sharing personal experiences with Shimshon Amitsur. Video recording from the 27th Amitsur Memorial Symposium 2020.

Einstein Institute of Mathematics alumni
Academic staff of the Hebrew University of Jerusalem
Jews in Mandatory Palestine
20th-century Israeli Jews
Israel Prize in exact science recipients
Israel Prize in exact science recipients who were mathematicians
Members of the Israel Academy of Sciences and Humanities
Institute for Advanced Study visiting scholars
20th-century Israeli mathematicians
Algebraists
Linear algebraists
Scientists from Jerusalem
1921 births
1994 deaths